The Great Western Railway 2900 Class or Saint Class, which was built by the Great Western Railway's Swindon Works, incorporated several series of 2-cylinder passenger steam locomotives designed by George Jackson Churchward and built between 1902 and 1913 with differences in the dimensions. The majority of these were built as 4-6-0 locomotives; but thirteen examples were built as 4-4-2 (but converted to 4-6-0 during 1912/13). They proved to be a successful class which established the design principles for GWR 2-cylinder classes over the next fifty years.

Background
After finally converting the last broad gauge lines in 1892, the Great Western Railway (GWR) began a period of modernization as new cut-off lines shortened its routes to west of England, South Wales and Birmingham. During the first decade of the twentieth century the Chief Mechanical Engineer, George Jackson Churchward, designed or acquired a number of experimental locomotives with different wheel arrangements and boiler designs to help him plan for the future motive power needs of the railway. The first of these was a two-cylinder 4-6-0 locomotive, designed in 1901 whilst Churchward was still the Chief Assistant of his predecessor William Dean.

Prototypes
Between 1902 and 1905 Churchward built and tested three prototype locomotives with detail differences, before using the third as the basis for the production series.

No. 100

The first prototype was completed at the Swindon Works of the GWR (Lot 132) in February 1902. It was numbered 100 and in June 1902 was named Dean (later William Dean) to mark the latter's retirement. The piston valves were driven by rocking levers actuated by the expansion link of Stephenson valve gear – this particular design was only used on no. 100. The parallel boiler was later replaced with a taper boiler, and then the first superheated taper boiler in 1910. Churchward had studied American boiler design, but he was also later influenced by continental practice in efficient motion design. From the Société Alsacienne de Constructions Mécaniques (SACM) a de Glehn 4-4-2 compound engine was ordered for comparative trials on the GWR. According to E.C. Poultney, No. 100 was the first 4-6-0 locomotive to have high enough boiler capacity and steam ports large enough to handle the steam flow required by large cylinders: "The engine probably influenced to a large extent the use made of engines of the 4-6-0 type". No.100 was renumbered 2900 in 1912, and was withdrawn from service in 1932.

No. 98

A second prototype locomotive, No. 98, was built at Swindon Works in March 1903 (Lot 138) to a similar design but with a taper boiler, re-designed valve gear layout and cylinders and a shorter wheelbase. According to Poultney, these improvements "may truly be said to be the keystone of the arch upon which all modern locomotives are designed". In 1906 this locomotive was re-boilered with a  boiler to correspond with the third prototype. This prototype locomotive was named Vanguard in 1907 (renamed Ernest Cunard in the same year). It was renumbered 2998 in 1912, received a superheated boiler in 1911 and was withdrawn in 1933.

No. 171
A third prototype, No. 171, was built at Swindon in December 1903 (Lot 145) incorporating the improvements to No. 98 but with a   boiler and minor amendments to the heating surface and grate area. It was built as a 4-6-0 but in October 1904 it was converted to a 4-4-2 to enable better comparison with the performance of the French built de Glehn 4-4-2 Compound; it was reconverted to 4-6-0 in July 1907. The conversion was carried out by substituting  trailing wheels with outside suspension for the final set of driving wheels. It was named Albion in 1904, renumbered 2971 in 1912, received a superheated boiler in 1910 and was withdrawn in 1946. No. 171 formed the basis of the main production series, introduced in 1905, although at this time Churchward was still unsure of the relative merits of the 4-4-2 and 4-6-0 wheel arrangements.

Production series
The Saint class appeared in four production series built between 1905 and 1913, each of which differed in dimensions. There were also differences between members of each series in terms of the boilers used, wheel arrangement, and arrangements for superheating.

Scott series

Whilst 171 was undergoing trials in 1905 nine further locomotives were ordered to be built at Swindon Works to a similar design (Lot 154) followed by a further ten (Lot 158), totalling 19 locomotives in this series. Thirteen of these were built as 4-4-2s and six as 4-6-0s. However, by January 1913, Churchward was persuaded by the superior adhesion provided by a 4-6-0 and they had all been converted to this wheel arrangement. The new locomotives were numbered 172–190 (renumbered 2972–2990 in 1912). Twelve of the series were named after characters in the novels of Sir Walter Scott. Directors of the GWR accounted for most of the other names. The series was withdrawn between 1931 and 1951.

Ladies
A second series of ten similar locomotives appeared in May 1906 (Swindon Lot 164), numbered 2901–10 and named after historical, mythological or poetical 'Ladies'. Nos. 2904–6 had short tapered boilers and short smokeboxes, whereas Nos. 2902–03 and 2907–10 had longer versions. No. 2901 Lady Superior was the first British locomotive to be built with a modern Schmidt superheater. The remainder of the locomotives were fitted with Swindon No.3 superheaters between 1909 and 1911 and were withdrawn between 1933 and 1952.

In May 1906 Charles Collett, then assistant manager of Swindon Works, supervised a demonstration run of number 2903 Lady of Lyons, newly released from the erecting shop.

Saints

A third series of twenty further locomotives appeared during August and September 1907 (Swindon Lot 170), numbered 2911–30 and named after Saints. The framing for these had long curved ends under the cab and over the cylinders, which greatly improved the rather angular appearance of the earlier locomotives. They were fitted with cone boilers and smokeboxes. In October 1908, No. 2922 Saint Gabriel was fitted with a Swindon No. 2 superheater. The following year the Swindon No. 3 superheater became standard for the class. Between 1909 and 1912 the remainder of the locomotives were fitted with the Swindon No. 3 superheater. The Saints were withdrawn between 1932 and 1951. No. 2925 Saint Martin was rebuilt with smaller wheels in December 1924 to become the prototype Collett 4900 and renumbered 4900 but still carrying the same name.

Courts

A fourth series of 25 locomotives appeared during the years 1911 to 1913 (Swindon Lots 185, 189 and 192). These were numbered 2931–55 and named after famous Courts (i.e. mansions). They were all built with superheaters and there were detailed differences between the boilers used on different lots. They were all withdrawn between 1948 and 1953.

Performance

The locomotives performed well as passenger locomotives over all the long-distance routes of the GWR and on all but the fastest express trains until they gradually became displaced to secondary services by the Castle Class in the late 1920s and 1930s. However, the  driving wheels limited their usefulness on freight trains. Churchward had recognized this limitation by the introduction of his GWR 4700 Class 2-8-0 design with  driving wheels in 1919, intended for express goods trains. However, Churchward's successor Charles Collett felt that a smaller-wheeled version of the 'Saint' class could form the basis of a successful mixed-traffic class of locomotives. He therefore rebuilt No. 2925 Saint Martin with  driving wheels to become the prototype of his successful Hall Class locomotives. Thus the 2900 class became a template for later GWR 2-cylinder 4-6-0 classes including the Modified Hall, Grange, Manor and County classes, all of which were of the same basic design.

Collett also experimented on several other members of the class. In 1923 No. 2933 was given an altered blastpipe and in 1927 No. 2947 was fitted with cylinder by-pass valves. In 1931 No. 2935 was rebuilt with Lentz-style rotary cam poppet valve gear, which remained in use until the engine was scrapped in 1948.

Assessment
The class incorporated many revolutionary advances which were influential in British locomotive design for the next fifty years.  According to The Great Western Society, 'Saint' class locomotives "represented one of the most important steps forward in railway traction of the 20th century", and they "are now acknowledged to have had a profound influence on almost every aspect of subsequent steam locomotive development".

Accidents and incidents
On 9 January 1932, locomotive No. 2949 Stanford Court was hauling a milk train that overran signals at Didcot East Junction and collided with a freight train. The locomotive was derailed and six wagons were slightly damaged.

List of locomotives

Withdrawal
The below list shows when all of the original 2900's were withdrawn from service.

Preservation

None of the original saints survived to preservation, so the Great Western Society purchased GWR 4900 Hall Class 4-6-0 No. 4942 Maindy Hall from Barry Scrapyard in 1974. The intention was to rebuild this Hall as a Saint, reversing the procedure where a Saint had been rebuilt as the Hall prototype. The project did not progress in the 1970s and 1980s, but finally started in earnest in 1995, by which time engineering capability in the preservation movement had greatly increased.  It was also decided that the engine would be built in the original straight frame form like the first Saints instead of the later curved frame style as fitted to Maindy Hall. Following thirty years of storage and fifteen years of rebuilding work 2999 Lady of Legend made its first moves in April 2019 and was formally launched at the Didcot Railway Centre in the same month.

See also 
 List of GWR standard classes with two outside cylinders

References

External links

Great Western Society "Great Western Archive", details of locomotives: 2900 - 2924,  2925 - 2955,   2971 - 2998

2900
4-6-0 locomotives
Railway locomotives introduced in 1902
Scrapped locomotives
Standard gauge steam locomotives of Great Britain
2′C h2 locomotives
2′B1 h2 locomotives
Passenger locomotives